The  was a light tank of World War II, produced in small numbers for the Imperial Japanese Army as an improvement of the existing Type 98 Ke-Ni. No Type 2 Ke-To light tanks are known to have engaged in combat prior to Japan's surrender at the end of World War II.

Design
The Type 2 Ke-To was based on the Type 98 Ke-Ni, using the same engine and bell crank suspension. However, the gun turret was enlarged to provide greater space for the crewmen and the main armament was changed to the more powerful Type 1 37 mm gun, with a muzzle velocity of 800 m/s. The new 37 mm gun used gave the tank "slightly better performance". The conical turret also carried a 7.7 mm machine-gun in a coaxial mount. The designation "Type 2" represented the Japanese Imperial Year 2602 (1942 AD), "Ke" represented "light", and "To" represented the number seven.

Production
Production commenced in 1944, with 34 units completed by the end of the war. No Type 2 Ke-To light tanks are known to have engaged in combat prior to Japan's surrender at the end of World War II.

Variant
The Type 4 Work vehicle was an engineering vehicle produced in 1944 on the chassis of the Type 2 Ke-To light tank. It was equipped with a dozer on the front end for use in airfield construction. It was also equipped with a 30kw power plant to power tools and had a flood light for night work. It is unknown how many were produced.

Footnotes

References

Further reading

External links

History of War: Type 2 Ke-To Light Tank
Taki's Imperial Japanese Army Page: Type 2 Light Tank "Ke-To"

Light tanks of Japan
2 Ke-To
Mitsubishi
Military vehicles introduced from 1940 to 1944